Vatra Moldoviței is a commune located in the western-central part of Suceava County, in the historical region of Bukovina, northeastern Romania. 

It is composed of three villages, namely: Ciumârna, Paltinu, and Vatra Moldoviței. The latter village is the site of the UNESCO World Heritage Site Moldovița Monastery. It lies on the banks of Moldovița River and some of its tributaries Ciumârna and Paltinu. It is flanked by two of the Bukovina Ridges: the Great Ridge and the Feredeu Ridge.

The first official record referring to the Vatra Moldoviței area dates to the time of Alexander the Good, who founded the Moldovița Monastery in 1402.

Administration and local politics

Communal council 

The commune's current local council has the following political composition, according to the results of the 2020 Romanian local elections:

References 

Communes in Suceava County
Localities in Southern Bukovina
Duchy of Bukovina